Stone Cold is a crime thriller written by David Baldacci. This is the third book to feature the Camel Club, a small group of Washington, D.C. civilian misfits led by "Oliver Stone", an ex-Green Beret and a former CIA trained assassin. The book was initially published on November 6, 2007 by Grand Central Publishing.

References

External links
Official website

2007 American novels
Novels by David Baldacci